Erdoğan Büyükkasap (February 3, 1962 – March 18, 2010) was a Turkish scientist and academic. He was president of Erzincan University, a university in Erzincan, Turkey.

Büyükkasap was born in Tosya, Kastamonu, Turkey on February 3, 1962. He received a bachelor's degree in 1983 and a master's degree in 1988 from Atatürk University. He became an associate professor at the university in 1994 and a full professor in 1999. He was later appointed as a dean. He was appointed by Ahmet Nejdet Sezer who was president until 2007. He was married and had one son and one daughter.

He was found dead on March 18, 2010 in the house provided for him by the government, apparently having hanged himself.

References 

1962 births
2010 suicides
Academic staff of Atatürk University
Atatürk University alumni
Turkish scientists
Academic staff of Erzincan Binali Yıldırım University
Rectors of universities and colleges in Turkey
Suicides by hanging in Turkey